Monica Rodriguez is an American politician in California.

Monica Rodriguez or Mónica Rodríguez may also refer to:

Mónica Rodríguez (Mónica Rodríguez Guzmán, born 1988), Mexican footballer
Mónica Rodríguez (astrophysicist) (Mónica Rodríguez Guillén, born 1969), Spanish astrophysicist working in Mexico
Mónica Olivia Rodríguez (Mónica Olivia Rodríguez Saavedra, born 1989), Mexican parathlete and middle-distance runner

See also
Monica Pimentel (Monica Fiorella Pimentel Rodriguez, born 1989), Aruban taekwondo competitor